Mikael Tillström (born 5 March 1972) is a former tennis player from Sweden, who turned professional in 1991.

Career
He represented his native country as at the 2000 Summer Olympics in Sydney, where he was defeated in the third round by Switzerland's Roger Federer. The right-hander won one career title in singles (Chennai, 1997) and eight career doubles titles, all but one with fellow Swede Nicklas Kulti. He also reached the final of 2000 Majorca Open winning en route to the final some specialist at clay like Francisco Clavet or Mariano Puerta, and only an almighty Marat Safin could stop him.

He reached his highest singles ATP-ranking on 14 October 1996, when he became world no. 39. His best performance at a Grand Slam came when he got to the quarter finals of the Australian Open in 1996, he defeated Aaron Krickstein, Christian Ruud, Patrick McEnroe and Thomas Muster before losing to Michael Chang. He was the first player to be beaten by Gustavo Kuerten in the main draw of a Grand Slam tournament, at the Australian Open in 1997. He is running the Good to Great Tennis Academy together with Magnus Norman and Nicklas Kulti and is coaching Gaël Monfils.

Junior Grand Slam finals

Singles: 1 (1 runner-up)

Doubles: 1 (1 runner-up)

ATP career finals

Singles: 5 (1 title, 4 runner-ups)

Doubles: 12 (8 titles, 4 runner-ups)

ATP Challenger and ITF Futures finals

Singles: 3 (2–1)

Doubles: 13 (11–2)

Performance timelines

Singles

Doubles

References

External links
 
 
 

1972 births
Living people
Swedish male tennis players
Swedish expatriates in Monaco
People from Monte Carlo
Olympic tennis players of Sweden
Tennis players at the 2000 Summer Olympics
Sportspeople from Jönköping